Harold Carl Manders (June 14, 1917 – January 21, 2010) was an American professional baseball player, a relief pitcher in Major League Baseball who appeared in 30 games for the Detroit Tigers (1941–42; 1946) and Chicago Cubs (1946).

Biography
Manders was born in Waukee, Iowa. He attended the University of Iowa in Iowa City, Iowa.

Manders played in 26 games in 1941 and 1942 for the Tigers. He also played in four games in 1946, two each with the Tigers and then two with the Cubs.

In a three-season MLB career, Manders posted a 3–1 record with a 4.77 ERA in 30 appearances, including one start, giving up 37 runs (five unearned) on 71 hits and 28 walks while striking out 28 in 60 innings of work. He did not record a save.

Manders lived to be one of the oldest former Major League ballplayers, dying in Waukee, Iowa, at the age of 92. He is interred at the Waukee Cemetery.

Manders' cousin was Baseball Hall of Fame pitcher Bob Feller.

References

External links

Hal Manders at Baseball Almanac

1917 births
2010 deaths
Alexandria Aces players
Baseball players from Iowa
Beaumont Exporters players
Buffalo Bisons (minor league) players
Chicago Cubs players
Detroit Tigers players
Evansville Bees players
Knoxville Smokies players
Major League Baseball pitchers
People from Waukee, Iowa
University of Iowa alumni